Ganoderma zonatum is a plant pathogen that infects the palm species causing butt rot. It is a fungus that infects the bottom  of the plant also rotting the roots. It has been known to be in both natural and planted environments and in the majority of cases only in palms.

Symptoms and diagnosis
Symptoms of Ganoderma zonatum are general decline in the health of the plant, wilting and discoloration of the leaves and slow growth. However, this is noticeable in many different plant diseases and can not be used as a diagnosis tool. There are only two ways to fully identify G. zonatum. One is the basidiocarp (or conk) forming on the plant with the other viewing the internal rotting of the palm on the inside once it has been cut down.

Life cycle

The fungus is spread between the plants due to the spores produced in the basidiocarp. The spores land on the soil and germinate. The hyphae then grow over the plant roots and up into the woody trunk. The fungus damages the palm trunk closest to the soil first, expands in diameter and moves up the center of the trunk causing a cone like shape of infected trunk. When the basidiocarp emerges it is at the highest point when the fungus will internally grow.

Protection and control
There is currently no method for the control of G. zonatum once it has been identified. However minimizing the amount of moisture can decrease the risk of a palm becoming infected by the fungus. In places where a palm has been infected with G. zonatum, no other palm should be planted as the spores can survive in the soil.
Some other prevention methods are
 Avoid injury to the trunks of palm trees.
 Be careful when using lawnmowers and other gardening equipment.
 Consult forestry officers after infestation and seek their advice.

Disposing of the wood
After fungal infection, the wood above the butt area can be easily mulched with caution, but for the lower   extreme care should be taken to prevent the fungus from spreading. Dispose of the wood by wrapping it in plastic. Use sterile tools and gloves. Sterilize your tools before using them on other healthy palms.

References

Fungal plant pathogens and diseases
Palm diseases
Ganodermataceae
Fungi described in 1902
Fungi of North America
Taxa named by William Alphonso Murrill